Daewoo Precision Industries K2 assault rifle is the standard service rifle of the South Korean military. It was developed by the South Korean Agency for Defense Development and manufactured by S&T Motiv (formerly Daewoo Precision Industries) and Dasan Machineries (since 2016). Shoulder-fired and gas-operated, the K2 is capable of firing both 5.56×45mm NATO and .223 Remington ammunition; however, using .223 Remington is only recommended for practicing for short distance.

The K2 supplanted the M16A1 assault rifle as the primary infantry weapon for the South Korean military since its adoption in 1985.

Development

In the 1960s, the South Korean armed forces relied completely upon military support from the United States to supply its small arms, consisting mostly of M1 Garands and M1/M2 carbines. Attempts at the time to develop an indigenous rifle were hampered by the country's economic, technological, and industrial shortcomings, and initial attempts never went into production. During South Korean involvement in the Vietnam War, South Korean army soldiers and marines received the more modern M16A1 assault rifle from U.S. military aid, though not enough to arm all active military personnel. With a modern rifle design and rapid economic growth in the 1970s, South Korea began to build the M16A1 under license in 1974.

Despite being able to produce their own service rifle, it was not an ideal arrangement; the original license agreement did not cover enough weapons to equip their forces including millions of reserves, and having to pay license fees to manufacture the design was too expensive at a time when the country was short on foreign currency. Geopolitical considerations played a factor, as the Nixon Doctrine and Carter administration's use of the U.S. military presence on the Korean peninsula as leverage to force change against South Korea's human rights practices. Under such influences, South Korea felt it necessary to be able to control their own basic weapon needs. Facing the eventual expiration of the Republic of Korea's license to produce the M16A1 (Colt Model 603K), president Park Chung-hee, who strongly believed in self-reliance in national defense, ordered the development of an indigenous standard military firearm.

An indigenous rifle program started in 1972. Initial requirements were for prototypes to be chambered in 7.62×51mm NATO as it was the only standardized ammunition for the Western Bloc. Prototypes XB-1 through XB-5 were akin to AR-15-series rifles with some exterior changes; designers attempted to use as many M16 components as possible to save time and money, such as the direct gas impingement operation, sights, and handguards. In 1975, the XB-6 prototype with long-stroke gas piston was created, and converted into 5.56×45mm NATO chambered XB-7 in 1977.

By 1982, the final prototype model XB-7C (XK2) was completed, and small amount was handed for field tests. It went into full-scale production and was officially fielded to the Republic of Korea Armed Forces in 1985.

K2C
After the K2 was adopted, hardly any changes were made to the gun for nearly 30 years. There were several reasons for this: the ROK Army maintained a Cold War-style mentality that favored tanks and artillery against an outdated North Korean threat, leaving less money and urgency to modernize infantry weapons and tactics; the manufacturer had been producing tens of thousands of rifles each year since the 1970s without competition for domestic customers that didn't request upgrades, leaving no motivation to make changes; and various management and ownership changes created internal chaos making it difficult to conduct research and development. Special forces units had more of a need to upgrade K-series weapons with new optics and accessories, so they turned to private companies to develop add-on rail systems. Because they were being supplied many non-standard rails from various companies, the regular ROK Army standardized the MIL-STD-1913 rail in 2013 for the PVS-11K red dot sight, which on the K2 is only a short rail on the upper receiver, since it is made with an optics mount on the receiver to attach it and regular troops have less of a need for additional rails.

The K2 and K1A had become outdated for international markets after 2000; in addition to lack of ability to add accessories, the K1A had become too large, underpowered, and un-ergonomic as a personal defense weapon or special operation carbine, and the K2 was too long. In 2012, S&T Motiv introduced the K2C, or K2 Carbine. In 2013, a new tan-painted K2C with Magpul CTR stock and detachable rear sight was unveiled, but not actually produced. In 2017, The New K2C-1/2 variants with a foldable front sight and ambidextrous selector switches were unveiled. In 2018, The New K2C-1 variant was renamed K2C CQB.

K2C1

To enhance the domestic appeal, S&T Motiv developed the K2A, which retains the full-length K2's features (including bayonet lug) while utilizing the upgrades of K2C including the upper receiver/handguard Picatinny rail, M4-style adjustable stock. Later, it was renamed K2C1 (C="Exterior design changed without performance improvements", by the South Korean Defense Specification) and adopted by ROK forces. K2C1 had several changes compared to K2A, including a new extended handguard rail with optional lower/side pictinny rail sections, flattop upper receiver with a detachable rear backup sight, and a new Magpul CTR-like adjustable stock. As of 2016, 200,000 K2C1s are in service with frontline troops. Partially due to the rail's screw attachment method, the K2C1 is slightly heavier than the original model. ( vs. )

Design

Six different prototypes were made during the XB development. Of the 6 designs, the XB6 was selected. Some parts of the XB6 resembled FN FNC such as the suppressor and sights. Further development of the XB6 evolved into the XB7 and finally the XB7C, also known as the XK2. Externally similar in appearance to the AR18, the K2 uses polymer for the forearm, pistol-grip and side-foldable buttstock. The fire control system and bolt carrier group are derived from the American M16 rifle, but few of the parts, including the bolt and carrier, are interchangeable with the M16. The gas operating system is derived from the AKM. The K2 uses the same magazine as the M16. The barrel rifling has 6 grooves, 185 mm (1-in-7.3) right hand twist. The K2 has 3 selective firing modes: semi-auto, 3-round burst, and full automatic.

The K2 can be equipped with the DPI K201, an undercarried 40×46mm single shot grenade launcher patterned after the American M203. The Republic of Korea Armed Forces originally planned to replace the entire K2 with new S&T Daewoo K11 dual-barrel air-burst weapon. However, high cost and skepticism over the effective firepower of the 20mm grenade led to the decision to provide 2 K11s to each squad, keeping 2 grenadiers as well. Consequently, the standard 9-person infantry squad of the Republic of Korea Armed Forces is currently equipped with 2 K2 rifles, 2 K2 rifles with K201 grenade launcher, 2 K11 DAWs, 1 K3 light machine gun, and the rest with either K1 or K2.

The K2 is also sometimes used with bipods and 4× magnification scopes, in a role similar to the Designated Marksman Rifle.
A more modern way to accessorize the K2 and K1 is to mount a now (limited) standard issue PVS-4K Rail Integration System. It consists of an aluminum body with a long, uninterrupted rail for optical/red-dot and night-vision sights and three other rails located on the bottom and both sides. The rails are of the Picatinny-type.

Despite the shortest handguard ever seen on any assault rifles, the K2C variants have had issues with overheating, and thus most of the K2's around the world are the original K2, with the barrel mostly exposed, unlike the K2C.

The K2 is also able to accept a brass catcher basket, as the South Korean army requires its soldiers to pick up and return empty cartridge cases after training sessions, both for financial reasons (the brass cases are recyclable) and for security reasons, as the soldier must prove he or she has actually expended the issued ammunition.  This minimizes the risk of a soldier keeping unauthorized live ammunition which could be used in criminal activities.

K1 and K2 weapons systems
When personnel from the South Korean army special command were invited to see the XB-series prototypes, they requested the development of a new submachine gun to quickly replace a series of different weapons in their use. With no time to develop a new weapon, ADD made one based on the XB rifle prototypes called XB-S (short). It used a direct impingement gas tube rather than a piston to achieve the required short length, which was faster to make since they had short-barrel CAR-15 designs to work off of and no time to redesign a new short gas piston. The barrel used 1:12 inch rifling to fire M193 rounds, as during its development there were no plans to adopt SS109 ammunition in the South Korean army. The shortened design was adopted as the K1A SMG in 1981 and issued to special forces, commanders, radio operators, and others who needed a short SMG-like weapon.

While the K1A SMG is commonly regarded as an SMG version of the K2, the K1 is a separate weapon altogether. The primary differences between the two weapons include: development time and intent (the K1 took less time to develop and entered service sooner than the K2, and was developed originally as a submachine gun because it was intended to replace the M3 Grease Gun; the K2 was developed from the start as a service rifle); rifling (K1: 1-in-12 twist; K2: 1-in-7.3 twist); and gas system (the K1 uses a direct impingement gas system, while the K2 uses a long stroke gas piston system). In addition, some parts are not interchangeable between the two weapons even though they can use the same cartridge (KM193 (.223 Remington) 5.56 caliber; the K2 can also utilize the K100 (SS109) 5.56 caliber round).

Variants

XB 
At least 6 versions (XB1 to XB6) of prototype were made.
 XB6: Selected design among the prototype.
 XB7: Further development of the XB6.
 XB7C: Final experimental prototype. Also known as XK2.

K2 
Mass-produced variant.
 DR-100: Semi-automatic 5.56×45mm NATO version for civilian market.
 DR-200: Semi-automatic .223 Remington version for civilian market.
 DR-300: Semi-automatic 7.62×39mm version for civilian market.
Exports started in 2012.
 K2C CQB: A manufacturer-proposed variant of K2C for close quarters combat operations, which was first unveiled by the name "The New K2C-1" in the ADEX 2017, and later renamed as "K2C CQB" in the DX KOREA 2018. It has a  barrel and has a firing range up to 500 meters with a Colt SCW-type buttstock, flip up sights, a horizontally modified magazine well angle, integrated picatinny rails and ambidextrous selector switches.

K2C1 
(C="Exterior design changed without performance improvements", by the South Korean Defense Specification) : New variant featuring a quad accessory rail, full-length 1913 Picatinny optics rail, an AR-15-style six position collapsing and a Magpul-based foldable stock. Comes in two barrel lengths, 305 mm (12 in) and 465 mm (18.3 in). It was officially sent into production in March 2016 with first deliveries in June 2016.

Users

 : K2C used by Special Forces Command (Cambodia) 128 K2s transferred according to a 2019 SIPRI small arms report.
 : Purchased in 2011.
 : Purchased in the late 1980s.
 : 210 K2 rifles purchased in 2008 and 2011. 806 K2s transferred according to a 2019 SIPRI small arms report.
 : K2C used by Iraqi special operations forces Golden Division (formerly Golden Brigade).
 : A standard-issue rifle of the ROK Armed Forces since 1985. Used extensively by the South Korean contingent in Operation Enduring Freedom and the Iraq War. A small number of K2Cs were tested by the Republic of Korea Army Special Warfare Command in 2014, but it has not been adopted by ROK forces. Later, tens of thousands of K2C1s were mass-produced in 2015 as part of the rifle modernization plan and were introduced around front-line units from 2016.
 : Used by the Lebanese Army.
 : Received 1,100 K2 and 1,000 K2C in 2012. 5,200 K2C delivered in 2012-2013. Known to be used by Malawian soldiers in the United Nations Force Intervention Brigade.
 : Purchased in 2011.
 : First customer of K2. Purchased 3,000 in 1983, and another batch in 1996. Additional 30,000 rifles were sold in 2006.
 : used by Special Forces at least since the 1990s. North Korean special forces with imitation ROK Military digital camo uniform and K2 rifles (unlicensed locally made copies) were reported by ROK Army soldiers during the 2015 North Korean exchanges of artillery fire with South Korea across the Western Front.
 : Purchased K2C in 2013.
 : Used by the Infantería de Marina del Perú (Peruvian Naval Infantry).
: Purchased K2C1 in 2019, used by Philippine National Police based from a contract in 2018.
 : Purchased 100 K2 rifles in 2003.
 : 403 K2s transferred according to a 2019 SIPRI small arms report.

Non-state actors
 : Captured from Iraqi troops. Also used by ISEA and various IS affiliated militants across Africa
 : Seen in the hands of Syrian rebels
  Boko Haram: Seen in Boko Haram captures and in use

Replacement versus upgrades

S&T Daewoo (now S&T Motiv) proposed the XK8, a 5.56×45mm NATO bullpup version of the K2 in early 2000. After a series of field tests, the XK8 was rejected by the South Korean military and was never mass-produced.

More recently, the development of the S&T Daewoo K11 dual-barrel air-burst weapon, which uses 5.56×45mm NATO and 20×30mm air-burst grenade, prompted the South Korean military to plan for the replacements of all K2 rifles in service with the K11, making K11 the standard service rifle for the armed forces. However, due to the K11's extremely high cost and weight for a standard rifle, the armed forces scrapped its original plan and decided to provide 2 K11 per squad in order to increase firepower. As of 2019, the K11 project is in a state of complete suspension. As a result, The K2 was retained as the standard service rifle.

In 2014, an upgraded K2 rifle, the K2C1 was introduced, and the South Korean Army performed field tests which were successful. K2C1 mass production began in 2015 to replace the K2 as the standard issue rifle for the ROK armed forces. Additional production of K2C1 rifles will push out K2 in active service, and eventually replace the reserve forces' M16A1s with K2 in the near future.

However, K2C1 is considered as temporary replacement for aging K2 rifles.

See also
 M16 rifle: used prior to and replaced by K2, and was license produced by the Arsenal of National Defense (now S&T Motiv).
 AK-47: influenced in designing gas piston system.
 Daewoo Precision Industries K1: shared same development program.
 S&T Daewoo XK8: proposed replacement, rejected after field test.
 S&T Daewoo K11: proposed replacement, rejected after field test.
 Dasan Machineries K16: possible replacement of K2 in the Republic of Korea Armed Forces.

References

External links

 S&T Daewoo Homepage

5.56 mm assault rifles
Military equipment of Fiji
Post–Cold War weapons of South Korea
Daewoo assault rifles
Kalashnikov derivatives
Weapons and ammunition introduced in 1985
Military equipment of Bangladesh